Alexander Erler and Arjun Kadhe were the defending champions but only Kadhe chose to defend his title, partnering Maximilian Neuchrist. Kadhe lost in the semifinals to Anirudh Chandrasekar and Vijay Sundar Prashanth.

Chung Yun-seong and Hsu Yu-hsiou won the title after defeating Chandrasekar and Prashanth 3–6, 7–6(9–7), [11–9] in the final.

Seeds

Draw

References

External links
 Main draw

Bengaluru Open - Doubles
2023 Doubles